Winston Churchill's address to Congress was a 30-minute World War II-era radio-broadcast speech made in the chamber of the United States Senate on December 26, 1941, in which the then prime minister of the United Kingdom addressed a joint session of the bicameral legislature of the United States about the state of the UK–U.S. alliance and their prospects for defeating the Axis Powers.

Churchill's speech to Congress was a public event of the larger Arcadia Conference in Washington, D.C. between the Anglo-American diplomatic and military corps to coordinate Allied plans for World War II following the U.S. declarations of war on Japan and Germany on December 8 and 11, respectively. Churchill had finished writing the text of the speech on Christmas Day in his rooms at the White House, after having attended church with President and Mrs. Roosevelt.  

Churchill opened the address with a reference to his Brooklyn-born mother, quipping, "I cannot help reflecting that if my father had been American and my mother British, instead of the other way round, I might have got here on my own. In that case, this would not have been the first time you would have heard my voice." The bulk of the speech was devoted to a promise of eventual victory—but not without a long grim journey between here and there. 

Churchill ended the speech by stating, "It is not given to us to peer into the mysteries of the future. Still, I avow my hope and faith, sure and inviolate, that in the days to come the British and American peoples will, for their own safety and for the good of all, walk together in majesty, in justice and in peace." To which Chief Justice Harlan Stone replied from the front row with a V for victory hand sign; Churchill replied in kind and the chamber erupted with cheers and thunderous applause. On the whole, the speech was extremely well-received by members of Congress and the American press.

Churchill followed up his address with an evening screening of The Maltese Falcon, in the company of President Roosevelt and Mackenzie King, the Prime Minister of Canada.  Churchill would address the Parliament of Canada four days later. 

Churchill was the second non-American head of government to address Congress; the first was Kalakaua, King of Hawaii, in 1874. Churchill does, however, still hold the record for most addresses to a joint session of Congress by any single visiting dignitary. In addition to the 1941 appearance, Churchill returned to Capitol Hill to address Congress again in 1943 and in 1952.

Wikisource has the complete text of Churchill's address to Congress.

See also

References

External links
 

December 1941 events
1941 speeches
Speeches by Winston Churchill
World War II speeches
State visits by British leaders
Diplomatic visits
Joint sessions of the United States Congress
77th United States Congress
Presidency of Franklin D. Roosevelt